In Greek mythology, Picolous is the name of one of the Gigantes, the offspring of the earth goddess Gaia and the sky god Uranus. Picolous fought against the Olympian gods during the Gigantomachy. He fled the battle, only to be slain shortly thereafter by Helios the sun god when the giant attempled to attack his daughter Circe. Picolous's role in the Gigantomachy is attested by two Byzantine scholars of the Middle Ages, Eustathius of Thessalonica and Patriarch Photios I of Constantinople, both of which quote earlier writers, Alexander of Paphos and Ptolemaeus Chennus respectively.

Mythology 

Patriarch Photius, who attributes the tale to Ptolemy Chennus, writes of an unnamed giant that attacked Circe and was killed by her father the sun god Helios, who was protecting his daughter; from his blood sprang a white herb, named moly after the hard battle (=môlos in Ancient Greek) that took place between the giant and the god.

In greater detail, the homeric scholiast Eustathius of Thessalonica, quoting Alexander of Paphos, writes that Picolous fought alongside the other Giants against Zeus during the war that was known as the Gigantomachy, but fled the battle; he went to Aeaea, the home island of the sorceress goddess Circe and attempted to chase her away from her land, but then her father Helios slew him. From the blood of the giant that seeped on the ground a herb, moly, was sprang that had a black root for the black blood of Picolous, and a white flower for the white Sun that killed him, or for that fact that Circe grew white out of terror.

As for real-world identifications, the plant that grew from Picolous's blood has been suggested to be the snowdrop, a flower that counteracts amnesia, hallucinations, and delusions, which are hypothesized to be the real physics behind Circe's magic.

See also 

 Alcyoneus
 Clytius
 Mimas (giant)
 Polybotes

Notes

References

External links 
 GIGANTES from The Theoi Project

Gigantes
Children of Gaia
Greek giants
Helios in mythology
Circe
Metamorphoses into flowers in Greek mythology